Żużela  (German Zuzella, 1934-45: Schlacken) is a village in the administrative district of Gmina Krapkowice, within Krapkowice County, Opole Voivodeship, in south-western Poland.

Firstly mentioned as Susela in 1213.

Main sights 
 manor house 
 wayside shrines (19th century, 1913 and one undated) 
 forge (built before 1939) 
 three granite glacial erratics stated as natural monuments

References

Villages in Krapkowice County